Rajković or Rajkovic (is a surname derived from a masculine given name Rajko. It may refer to:

Ante Rajković (born 1952), Bosnian defender who played for SFR Yugoslavia
Emil Rajković (born 1978), Macedonian former professional basketball player and current coach
Dušan Rajković (born 1942), Serbian chess grandmaster
Ljubiša Rajković (born 1950), Serbian defender who played for SFR Yugoslavia
Marko Rajković (born 1992), footballer
Miodrag Rajković (born 1972), basketball coach
Predrag Rajković (born 1995), Serbian footballer who plays as goalkeeper
Slobodan Rajković (born 1989), Serbian footballer who plays as a centre back
Trajko Rajković (1937–1970), Yugoslavian basketball player

Other
Rajković (Mionica), a Serbian village

See also
Rajkoviće
Rajović
Rakovci (disambiguation)
Rašković
Raškoviće
Raškovice

Serbian surnames